Tureng Tepe ("Hill of the Pheasants"; alternatively spelled in English as Turang Tappe/Tape/Tappa/Tappeh) is a Neolithic and Chalcolithic archaeological site in northeastern Iran, in the Gorgan plain, approximately 17 km northeast of the town of Gorgan. Nearby is a village of Turang Tappeh.

Description

Tureng Tepe consists of a group of mounds interspersed with ponds and water courses. The whole archaeological pattern is about 800 – 900 m in diameter. Most of the mounds rise between 11 and 15 m above the level of the surrounding plan, but the steep central mound, marked A on the Wulsin's plan, is over 30 m high and dominated the entire site.

The oldest remains on the site date to the Neolithic and Chalcolithic periods. The Bronze Age settlement portion of the site dates from approximately 3100-2900 BC through 1900 BC.  In 1841, some material (including gold vessels) from the site was sent to the Shah (Mohammad Shah Qajar), and examined by Clement Augustus (C.A.) de Bode, piquing initial modern interest in the site.  The first modern excavations were done by Frederick Wulsin in 1931, sponsored by the Atkins Museum of Fine Arts.  Grey ware pottery from the site was found and studied.  In the mid-20th century, the site (a hill) had a height of approximately 30m.  In 1959, Jean Deshayes (1924–1979) rediscovered the site, and regular excavations began soon after until 1979.

Figurines
The figurines of Tureng Tepe have long been recognized as quite remarkable. They include both terracotta and stone figurines.

As far as the stone figurines, there are many similarities between Tureng and the nearby sites of Shah Tepe, Tepe Hissār, and Gohar Tappeh. Yet the terracotta figurines of Tureng Tepe are unparalleled at any other nearby site. These baked clay figurines find their parallels with sites further away, in Turkmenistan and the Indus valley. Some parallels as far as Mesopotamia have been suggested.

Based on the patterns that emerge from various excavated artefacts, it is clear that Tureng Tepe is a site of special importance in its immediate region.

Chronology

Neolithic and Chalcolithic
Tureng IA (Neolithic period - these layers are assumed to lie below the water table. From this horizon occur Djeitun-like sherds, incorporated in bricks made in later periods)
Tureng IB (Late Neolithic period - again presumably below the water table)
Tureng IIA (Early Chalcolithic period)

Bronze Age

Tureng IIB (ca. 3100–2600 BC)
Tureng III A / B (ca. 2600–2100 BC). To this period belongs an enormous, mud-bricks high terrace, constructed in the center of the settlement and representing perhaps the earliest example of monumental architecture in this region.
Tureng III C (about 2100 -? BC)

Iron Age
Tureng IV A (Iron Age, possibly 7th century BC)
Tureng IV B Iron Age, possibly 6th century BC)
Tureng VA (2nd century BC)

Historical time
Tureng VB (1st century BC)
Tureng VC / D (1st–2nd century AD)
Tureng VI A Sasanian empire(3rd–5th century AD)
Tureng VI B end of the Sasanian empire (possibly 6th - 7th centuries)
Tureng VII A / B Islamic occupation at the top of Mound A(10th–11th century AD)
Tureng VIII some Islamic remains located in the south-west part of the site (possibly 13th century AD)

During the Bronze Age, Tureng Tepe was likely a thriving settlement.

See also
Yarim Tepe (Iran)
Cities of the Ancient Near East

References

Additional sources
 
 Deshayes, J., 1968 – Tureng Tepe and the Plain of Gorgan in the Bronze Age.  Archaeologia, I(1), Paris.
 Fouilles de Tureng Tepe (1987)
 Wulsin, F.R., 1932 – Excavation at Tureng Tepe, near Asterabad.  Supplement to the Bull.  American Inst.  Persian Art and Archaeology, New York

External links

Turang Tepe, View of the Mound, From an Altitude of 1,740 M on May 12, 1937 - Oriental Institute
Report on similar finds at the nearby Bazgir Tepe - Tehran Times 2011

Tells (archaeology)
Archaeological sites in Iran
History of Golestan Province
Buildings and structures in Golestan Province
Neolithic sites of Asia
Prehistoric Iran